The Pozen is a right tributary of the river Suceava in Romania. It discharges into the Suceava in the village Satu Mare. Part of its water is diverted by a canal from north of Rădăuți to the Suceava near Măneuți, upstream from its natural mouth.

References

Rivers of Romania
Rivers of Suceava County